Blame the Vain is the 16th studio album by country music artist Dwight Yoakam, released in June 2005, and his first not to be produced by guitarist producer Pete Anderson. Yoakam wrote all the songs and produced the album himself. He also directed the videos for "Intentional Heartache" and the title track.

Background
After a near twenty year creative partnership, Yoakam and bandleader Anderson went their separate ways after recording Population Me in 2003 when the singer opted to tour with a small group rather than a full band.  This was in part due to financial necessity after Yoakam bankrolled his 2001 film project South of Heaven – West of Hell, which was a critical and commercial bust.  Both Anderson and Yoakam agreed to be interviewed separately for Don McCleese’s book A Thousand Miles from Nowhere, and while both show a great deal of respect for each other and pride in the music they made together, an undercurrent of tension is evident, with Yoakam stating of his collaboration with Anderson, “Maybe it went about four albums too long.”  Anderson, who claims his first love all along was playing in front of an audience as opposed to producing, later explained:

The pair’s commercial peak came in 1993 with the album This Time, but by the early 2000’s Yoakam was no longer on a major label, having signed with the Americana-based New West.

Recording and composition
Yoakam cited Simon and Garfunkel’s masterpiece Bridge Over Troubled Water as an inspiration for the sound he was going for as a producer, detailing to biographer Don McCleese:

While Blame the Vain did not result in any hit singles, producing the album appeared to reinvigorate Yoakam, with Mark Deming writing in his AllMusic review of the LP, “With Yoakam producing himself for a change without the help of longtime studio partner Pete Anderson, Blame the Vain also finds him fronting a new band anchored by guitarist Keith Gattis, and the new blood seems to have done wonders for Yoakam - while he wasn't exactly in a slump, Blame the Vain boasts a sharper and more energetic approach than his last several efforts, with ‘Just Passin' Time,’ ‘Three Good Reasons,’ and the title cut revealing that Yoakam is still a honky tonk man supreme.”  Thematically, Blame the Vain is concerned with façades and self-deceit that mask the corollaries of heartbreak  Yoakam later stated that "I Wanna Love Again" "...was written about my relationship with music.  And I wanted to feel like I was fifteen years old again.  The song talks about actually having a band, performing live music, or cutting a record, or at sixteen waiting for that opportunity...And it's not easy to get back to that place, that space...

Although steeped in Bakersfield honky-tonk, Yoakam chose to experiment on several tracks, the most obvious examples being “She’ll Remember,” which contains a synthesizer introduction and Yoakam speaking in a quasi-British accent until the songs falls into heavy honky-tonk mode, and the heavily-orchestrated losing track.  His acting chops come to the fore again on the storytelling title track as he assumes the role of an awestruck bystander describing the apoplectic woman in the song.  Yoakam, who is a big Beatles fan, also chose to open the album with a note of feedback that sounds almost exactly the same as found on the Fab Four’s “I Feel Fine,” and the main guitar part on “When I First Came Here” is reminiscent of “I’ve Got a Feeling” from Let It Be.  As one critic noted, “There’s an unbridled lack of restraint on these cuts that listeners could dismiss as self-indulgence but which plainly sound like freedom of the artist.”

Reception
Slant calls Blame the Vain “a new peak in a career full of them and is Yoakam’s finest work in a decade.” AllMusic: “Two decades into his career, Dwight Yoakam is still the man who is too country for Nashville, and on Blame the Vain he shows he's got too much strength and soul to let anyone hold him down - this is inspired stuff from a rebel who still has plenty to offer.”

Track listing
All songs were written and produced by Dwight Yoakam.
 "Blame the Vain" - 3:40
 "Lucky That Way" - 3:22
 "Intentional Heartache" - 4:25
 "Does It Show?"  - 3:48
 "Three Good Reasons"  - 2:37
 "Just Passin' Time"  - 3:46
 "I'll Pretend" - 2:22
 "She'll Remember"  - 5:26
 "I Wanna Love Again" - 2:57
 "When I First Came Here"  - 5:47
 "Watch Out"  - 3:03
 "The Last Heart in Line" - 2:59

Personnel
 Jim Barth - string arrangements
 Jessica Bolter - oboe
 Al Bonhomme - acoustic guitar
 Jonathan Clark - background vocals
 Thomas Dienner - background vocals
 Gary Ebbins - handclapping 
 Skip Edwards - Fender Rhodes, Hammond B-3 organ, handclapping, pedal steel guitar, piano, string arrangements, synthesizer, Wurlitzer piano
 Eric Gaenslen - cello
 Keith Gattis - bass guitar, electric guitar, handclapping 
 Bobbye Hall - bongos, cabasa, cowbell, shaker, tambourine
 Mitch Marine - drums, handclapping
 Gerry McGee - acoustic guitar, soloist
 Taras Prodaniuk - bass guitar
 Dave Roe - background vocals
 Timothy B. Schmit - background vocals
 Lee Thornburg - french horn
 Phillip Vaiman - violin
 Dwight Yoakam - acoustic guitar, soloist, lead vocals, background vocals

Chart performance

Album

Singles

References

Bibliography

2005 albums
Dwight Yoakam albums
New West Records albums